Mansion of the Doomed (U.K. theatrical title: The Terror of Dr. Chaney; also known as Massacre Mansion, Eyes, Eyes of Dr. Chaney and House of Blood) is a 1976 American exploitation horror film directed by Michael Pataki and starring  Richard Basehart and Gloria Grahame.

While not prosecuted for obscenity, the film was seized and confiscated in the U.K. under Section 3 of the Obscene Publications Act 1959 during the video nasty panic.

Plot
Nancy Chaney, the daughter of Los Angeles surgeon Leonard Chaney, loses her eyesight following a violent car accident. Leonard becomes determined to restore her eyesight, along with the help of his assistant, Katherine, first experimenting with the idea of an animal corneal transplant. He soon becomes obsessed with the idea of performing a full eye transplant, despite Katherine's insistence that it would destroy Nancy's optic nerve.

Leonard drugs one of his ophthalmologist peers, Dr. Dan Bryan, and harvests his eyes for Nancy. The surgery fails, and Leonard keeps the now-eyeless Dan locked in his basement. Meanwhile, Leonard continues to search for new potential eye "donors", picking up a witless female hitchhiker on Sunset Boulevard, kidnapping her, and bringing her to his home to harvest her eyes and transplant them into Nancy. Another surgical failure, Leonard begins to interview women under the guise of them applying for a job as caregiver for his daughter.

As the transplants continue to fail, Leonard amasses a group of eyeless victims whom he keeps contained in a large holding cell in his basement. Katherine, horrified by the mounting situation, suggests to Leonard that he perform mercy killings on them to put them out of their misery. Leonard next attempts to kidnap a young girl, promising to take her to Disneyland, but she manages to escape.

Leonard's victims soon devise a way to break out of their cell, and manage to escape from the house. One is stopped by Leonard and Katherine, while another woman flees down the street, with Leonard in pursuit. She screams for help, but runs into traffic and is hit and killed by a motorist. Detective Simon begins investigating the eyeless woman's death, and visits Leonard for his professional opinion on the state of the woman's body, specifically her lack of eyes. Leonard tells Simon that, though rare in younger people, the eyes may be removed for a number of reasons, ranging from syphilis to cancer.

After Simon leaves, Leonard enters the basement and promises his victims that he will restore their eyes once Nancy's surgery is successful. During this, Dan reaches through the bars of the cage and strangles Katherine to death. Leonard harvests the dead Katherine's eyes, transplanting them into Nancy, and buries Katherine on his property. Miraculously, the transplanted Katherine's eyes function properly, and Nancy awakens with her vision restored. She stumbles downstairs, where she comes across her father's cage of "donors", and is horrified by what she sees. She subsequently pretends to be blind, leading her father to believe the surgery was another failure. Shortly after, Nancy frees her father's victims from their cell, and Al, one of the "donors", gouges out Leonard's eyes with his finger before the rest of the captives flee from the doctor's home.

Cast

References

External links 

1976 horror films
1976 films
American exploitation films
American horror films
Films about organ transplantation
Films scored by Robert O. Ragland
Films set in Los Angeles
Films shot in Los Angeles
Mad scientist films
Organ trade in fiction
1970s exploitation films
1970s English-language films
1970s American films